Baskil is a town of Elazığ Province of Turkey. It is the seat of Baskil District. Its population is 4,826 (2021).

In the 2019 local elections, AKP mayor İhsan Akmurat narrowly won reelection, beating the MHP candidate Tuncer Turus by 49.77% to 48.57%.

References

Towns in Turkey
Populated places in Elazığ Province
Baskil District
Kurdish settlements in Elazığ Province